Kabayan (KApangyarihan ng mamamayan, BAlita at talakaYAN) is the longest-running radio program hosted by Noli de Castro that aired from 1986 to 2001, from 2010 to 2021 and from 2021 to present on DZMM-AM and its television counterpart TeleRadyo. It is also simulcast on ABS-CBN and on Kapamilya Channel since 2020.

History
Kabayan (Kapangyarihan ng Mamamayan, Balita at Talakayan) premiered in late 1986 on DZMM-AM with Noli de Castro, coinciding with his move from late-afternoons to early mornings after DZMM Balita (renamed Radyo Patrol Balita). The program focuses on issues relating to the political and social situation in the Philippines. Its efforts resulted to the show becoming DZMM's top-rating radio program. 

In February 2001, it had to end its run in order to allow de Castro to run for the Senate. Replacement programs and eventually Todo Balita took over the timeslot.

On July 12, 2010, Kabayan returned to DZMM with de Castro as its host, replacing Todo Balita on the 5:00 a.m. to 7:00 a.m. time slot. During this period, approximately its first 15 minutes was also simulcast on free TV via ABS-CBN. On January 10, 2011, the program was moved to the 6:00 a.m. to 8:00 a.m. time slot, combining it with Radyo Patrol Balita: Alas Siyete, wherein de Castro joined Ted Failon as the co-anchor of the newscast; Failon also joined de Castro as the co-anchor of Kabayan'''s 7:30am edition. In January 2020, the program updated its OBB and title card on DZMM TeleRadyo, in preparation for the 10th anniversary celebration of the program's return to air.

From March 18 to May 1, 2020, Kabayan and Radyo Patrol Balita Alas-Siyete were simulcast on ABS-CBN from 6:00 a.m. to 8:00 a.m., temporarily replacing Umagang Kay Ganda as provisional programming, due to the enhanced community quarantine in Luzon as a result of the COVID-19 pandemic. The program was also simulcast alongside Radyo Patrol Balita: Alas Siyete (later TeleBalita and TeleRadyo Balita) from June 15 to September 18, 2020, on Kapamilya Channel.

On September 21, 2020, Kabayan began airing at its new timeslot at 8:00 am, limiting it back to a runtime of one hour, to make way for the return of Gising Pilipinas at 6:00 am. The move temporarily ended its simulcast on Kapamilya Channel before resuming again on October 26.

On October 7, 2021, the program ended as de Castro left the network to run for senator once again. TeleRadyo's special coverage on the last day of filing of certificate of candidacies for the 2022 elections and eventually TeleRadyo Balita and On the Spot took over the timeslot. However, de Castro withdrew his candidacy on October 13, thus making the program return on November 8 on the same timeslot.

FormatKabayan is a commentary program where de Castro tackles the latest issues. 

Among the notable features of the program was its signature closing song, What a Wonderful World by Louis Armstrong and Kenny G. 
The ending song was temporarily shelved in January 2019 and replaced by random old songs chosen by de Castro. However, it was reverted into the original song after a while.

Since May 8, 2020, the song was replaced again by Kapamilya Forever (and later Tinig ng mga Nawalan, Ikaw ang Liwanag at Ligaya, Ikaw ang Sunshine Ko, Isang Pamilya Tayo, Bawal Lumabas (The Classroom Song), Andito Tayo Para Sa Isa't Isa and Tayo Ang Ligaya Ng Isa't Isa), in support of ABS-CBN and DZMM when both stations were closed due to a cease and desist order issued by the NTC. However, in 2022, the closing song has its permanent replacement, Feel Good Pilipinas by KZ Tandingan and BGYO, until it was temporarily replaced by Tayo Ang Ligaya ng Isa't Isa.

From 2011 to 2020, the program, when it was aired from 6:00 a.m. to 8:00 a.m., used to be combined with Radyo Patrol Balita: Alas Siyete (later rebranded as TeleBalita)  from 7:00 a.m. to 7:30 a.m. wherein de Castro joins Ted Failon, who was later replaced by Ricky Rosales and then Joyce Balancio after Failon leaving the network on August 31, 2020. 

On some occasions when De Castro would not appear on his program due to special assignments, health concerns, and other days off, an alternative anchor would host the program. The Radyo Patrol Balita: Alas Siyete/TeleBalita'' portion would be anchored by Joyce Balancio and the designated substitute. Among his former relievers were the late Lito Villarosa, Ted Failon, and Gerry Baja - with Villarosa being the most notable due to his vocal resemblance with De Castro; this lasted until 1993 when his role as a lead reliever was taken over by Ted Failon.

Anchors

Main anchor
Noli de Castro (1986–2001, 2010–2021, 2021–present)

Substitute anchors
Joyce Balancio
Johnson Manabat
Alvin Elchico
Robert Mano
Tony Velasquez
Danny Buenafe
Sherrie Ann Torres
Henry Omaga-Diaz

Former anchors
Ted Failon (2011–2012, 2020)

Awards
Finalist of 2012 New York Festival (NYF) for World's Best Radio Program

See also
KBYN: Kaagapay ng Bayan

References

Philippine radio programs
1986 radio programme debuts
ABS-CBN News and Current Affairs shows